Eduard Sharmazanov (born 8 November 1975) is an Armenian politician of Greek descent. Since 12 June 2011, he has been a Vice President of the National Assembly. After the 2017 Armenian parliamentary election, on 18 May 2017, he was re-elected to that position. Since 2011, he has been the spokesperson of Republican Party of Armenia.

On October 12, after the Armenian defeat on the 2020 Nagorno-Karabakh war, he was arrested among other opposition leaders on charges of "illegal conduction of rallies".

References

1975 births
Living people
Armenian people of Greek descent
People from Lori Province
20th-century Armenian politicians
21st-century Armenian politicians